Sue McIntosh (née Menlove; born 1946) is an Australian television actress, presenter and journalist.

Career 
During the 1960s and 1970s, McIntosh was an actress who worked in British and Australian television. Her early credits include a 1965 episode of The Benny Hill Show from its run on BBC Television, Where the Bullets Fly (1966) and hosting the children's show Adventure Island from 1969 to 1972.

In the 1970s she also featured on The Paul Hogan Show, The Graham Kennedy Show, The Ernie Sigley Show, The Don Lane Show, The Mike Walsh Show and The Ted Hamilton Show. Later she was the host of Take 5 and You Me and Education.

Her acting credits include Matlock Police, Division 4, Homicide and Prisoner.

McIntosh was also a news presenter on ABC News Victoria.

During the early 2000 period McIntosh made a much long-awaited return to TV with her own community TV based show from Melbourne titled Sue McIntosh Presents (2001-2002) where she interviewed a number of showbiz friends whom she has been friends with over the years, her most noted guest being Olivia Newton-John during 2001.

Filmography 
Film

Television

Awards 
As Sue Donovan, she received the Victorian Most Popular Female Logie Award for 1971.

Personal life 
McIntosh was known prior to the mid-1970s as Sue Donovan, from her marriage to actor Terence Donovan, which started in 1965 and ended in divorce in 1973. Their son is Australian actor/singer Jason Donovan, from whom she is estranged. Her maiden name was Menlove, as confirmed in the BBC1 program Who Do You Think You Are?, broadcast on 30 August 2010. She has been married to John McIntosh since 1974. They have three daughters: Katherine, Olivia and actress Stephanie McIntosh.

References

External links
1979 TV Times cover at TelevisionAU

1946 births
Living people
ABC News (Australia) presenters
Australian television actresses
Date of birth missing (living people)
Place of birth missing (living people)
Australian women television journalists